The Chevrolet Constantia is an automobile which was marketed by Chevrolet in South Africa from 1969 to 1978.

First series 
The first series Chevrolet Constantia went on sale in May 1969, along with the lower priced Kommando. It was based on the Australian Holden Brougham four-door sedan, but featured a unique frontal treatment. The styling changes were undertaken in General Motors' Port Elizabeth studios in South Africa  and the model was locally produced. The Constantia was offered with a 4.1 litre six and a 5.0 litre V8. 843 were sold in 1969 followed by 750 in 1970 and 800 in 1971.

AQ series 

The AQ series Constantia was introduced in 1972 and was based on another Australian design, the Statesman HQ. Again, frontal styling was different from the Australian model, this time featuring a unique grille based on the 1970 Chevrolet Malibu. The restyling work was a joint effort undertaken in Australia. The AQ Series Constantia was offered with a 4.1-litre six and a 5.0-litre V8.  Wheel covers came from the 1971-72 North American Chevelle Malibu.

AJ series 
The revised AJ series Constantia was marketed in South Africa from 1975 to 1978. It was offered as a four-door sedan, based on the Statesman HJ and as a five-door wagon,  based on the Holden HJ wagon. The AJ Series was offered with a 4.1-litre six and a 5.0-litre V8. A more luxurious version was sold as the Chevrolet Caprice Classic.

Sales
These are the South African official sales numbers.

References

External links 

 1971 Chevrolet Constantia brochure cover at www.flickr.com
 Chevrolet Constantia (AQ) brochure cover at www.flickr.com
 1976 Chevrolet Constantia (AJ) brochure (thumbnails only), www.moby302.co.za, as archive at web.archive.org

Constantia
Cars of South Africa
Cars introduced in 1969
1970s cars